Pazyryk may refer to:

Pazyryk Valley, a valley of Ukok Plateau, Siberia
The Iron Age Pazyryk burials found there
The wider Pazyryk culture, the archaeological culture associated with the burials